Lepp is a surname, very common in Estonia (meaning alder), and may refer to:
Bil Lepp, American storyteller
Ignace Lepp (1908–1966), Estonian-French writer and priest
Jaan Lepp (1895–1941), Estonian veteran of War of Independence
James Lepp (born 1938), Canadian golfer
Kadri Lepp (born 1979), Estonian actress and children's writer
Marta Lepp (1883–1940), Estonian writer
Peeter Lepp (born 1943), Estonian politician

Estonian-language surnames
Russian Mennonite surnames